Tree Paine is an American public relations executive who is best known as Taylor Swift's publicist.

Career

In 1995, Paine joined Interscope Records, where she worked with artists like No Doubt, Snoop Dogg, and Nine Inch Nails. She left Interscope to launch her own street marketing firm, which merged with Immortal Records in 1999.

Paine worked at the Academy of Country Music until 2007, when she was hired as the senior vice-president at Warner Music Group, where she oversaw all publicity for their country and Christian divisions of Warner Music Nashville.

In 2014, Paine announced that she would leave Warner Music to start her own public relations firm, Premium PR. Her first client was Taylor Swift. Paine is known for guiding Swift through many high-profile moments, including a number of breakups, Swift's sexual assault trial against former radio host David Mueller, and the dispute over Swift's masters.

Paine was featured in Swift's 2020 Netflix documentary Miss Americana, directed by Lana Wilson, which received critical acclaim upon release. The Cut opined that Paine has built a reputation as a "quiet but ferocious PR pitbull".

Personal life

Paine is married to Lance Paine, the president of Scott Brothers Global. They have a daughter named Lux Lucy Paine.

References

Living people
American public relations people
Marketing women
21st-century American businesspeople
Year of birth missing (living people)